Big-Headed Kid and Small-Headed Father is a 1995 Chinese animated cartoon television series jointly produced by CCTV and Shanghai Oriental TV. It was starring a family in Shanghai. Small-Headed father caters to the needs of his wife and child. Charles Liu of The Beijinger stated that unlike Homer Simpson, Small-Headed Father lacks selfishness, but otherwise it "firmly has The Simpsons in mind when it comes to dopey dads."

References

External links
 Big-Headed Kid and Small-Headed Father on iQiyi

Chinese animated television series